Eilert Dahl (15 September 1919 – 3 November 2004) was a Norwegian nordic skier who competed in the late 1940s and early 1950s. He won a bronze medal in the cross-country skiing 4 × 10 km relay at the 1950 FIS Nordic World Ski Championships in Lake Placid, New York.

Dahl also finished sixth in the nordic combined event at the 1948 Winter Olympics in St. Moritz.

Cross-country skiing results
All results are sourced from the International Ski Federation (FIS).

Olympic Games

World Championships
 1 medal – (1 bronze)

References

External links
 . Nordic combined profile
 
 
World Championship results 

1919 births
2004 deaths
Cross-country skiers at the 1948 Winter Olympics
Nordic combined skiers at the 1948 Winter Olympics
Norwegian male cross-country skiers
Norwegian male Nordic combined skiers
FIS Nordic World Ski Championships medalists in cross-country skiing
20th-century Norwegian people